An ocean data acquisition system (ODAS) is a set of instruments deployed at sea to collect as much meteorological and oceanographic data as possible. With their sensors, these systems deliver data both on the state of the ocean itself and the surrounding lower atmosphere. The use of microelectronics and technologies with efficient energy consumption allows to increase the types and numbers of sensor deployed on a single device.

Definition 
According to Intergovernmental Oceanographic Commission and World Meteorological Organization (WMO), "ODAS means a structure, platform, installation, buoy, or other device, not being a ship, together with its appurtenant equipment, deployed at sea essentially for the purpose of collecting, storing or transmitting samples or data relating to the marine environment or the atmosphere or the uses thereof."

Use 
Each hour, the data gathered by the system is transferred to the WMO's Global Telecommunications System by a geostationary satellite after having gone through a number of quality checks. Real-time data with information on the maritime environment can then be used for forecasts of physical states like weather, ocean currents or wave conditions which, in turn, may serve to warn seafarers of unfavourable conditions in the area.

ODAS types 

ODAS can be mounted on the following structures:
 Lighthouses
 Lightvessels
 Towers
 Offshore platforms
 Buoys

ODAS buoys are not navigational aids but have been included into the IALA Maritime Buoyage System. The structures have a fixed geographical position.

Data 
Data gathered by an ODAS may include the following parameters:
 Air temperature
 Atmospheric pressure at sea level
 Wind direction
 Wind speed including gusts
 Sea state
 Wave height
 Sea surface temperature

Disadvantages 
 ODAS buoys are expensive to obtain and need to be deployed by specialised vessels.

References

Oceanographic instrumentation
Meteorological instrumentation and equipment